Asia is rich in mineral resources due to unique geographical conditions. The main minerals are petroleum, coal, iron, manganese, tin,   tungsten, antimony, copper, lead, zinc, aluminum, gold, silver, mica and precious stone.

In most of the deposits, oil and natural gas resources rank first in all continents and can be divided into three oil storage zones. The first oil storage zone extends east to northwest China, south from Mesopotamia Plain, Persian Gulf and the Iranian Plateau. From the east to Myanmar, and south to Sumatra. The most famous is the Persian Gulf oil and gas fields located in Saudi Arabia, the oil reserves account for 60% of the total reserves in the world, which Saudi Arabia accounts for 1/4 of the world's total reserves. The second oil storage zone rises from Sakhalin Island to the north and passes through Hokkaido and the east of Taiwan Island. The third oil storage zone is located in Western Siberia. Hence, many countries regard mining as their main source of income, especially in Saudi Arabia, China and Iran.

Mining is a complex industry. Mining minerals not only require enormous energy and financial resource, but also copes with a variety of core problems. For example, how to standardize the operation of mining industry, how to ensure the safety of miners, how to avoid the occurrence of mining accidents and so on. Therefore, countries are actively committed to reducing the negative impact of mining.



Work safety
Safety has long been a concern in the mining industry, especially in underground mining. There are many occupational hazards associated with mining, such as mining equipment produces considerable noise and puts miners at risk of hearing loss. Although all miners have right to require a safe and healthy workplace, this right is not a reality for most of the workers. Mining industry has made a great contribution to the growth of gross domestic product (GDP), the life and health of miners are not fully respected by the whole industry. In order to effectively address the Occupational Safety and Health (OSH) problems for the miners in Asia, 11 countries discussed this issue in Ulaanbaatar, Mongolia. One of the solutions is that set up a union check inspector in all countries. They could promote institutions to improve working conditions for miners. The lack of regulation of Small-Scale Mining (SSM) results in OSH problems and child labor. The government offers a policy called ‘Fitness for Work’ which require companies be responsible for the health of miners. ‘Mine Safety and Health Convention’ (NO.176) was proposed as a core of the occupational safety and health work in 1995. However, few states have ratified Convention No. 176. Philippines is the only Asian member State ratifies the Convention. Therefore, the Council decided to hold a two-day seminar in the Asian area to outline good practices for safe mining.

Illegal labor
The main feature of Small-Scale Mining (SSM) is a family business, which means a group of families gather resources together and attempt to find precious metals from known deposits or excavated mines abandoned by large mining companies. According to data statistics, 4 million workers are found to be in Asia who engaged in SSM activities out of 6 million, mostly in China, Philippines and India. The issues brought about by SSM are similar globally and locally. SSM provides a number of career opportunities for women and children who lack of educated and unskilled, most of them live in rural areas and undergo poverty. Actually, they were all forced to join the SSM, driven by poverty and lack of food.

The recent ILO’s global report confirms that there are estimated 127.3 million economically active children age from 5 to 14 in Asia. According to a survey by the National Bureau of Statistics in 1995, the mining department employed about 15626 children in mining. More than 31% of children drop out of high school, and others do poorly at school. Poverty is the common reason for why child labour exists. The purpose of child labor is to assist parents to subsidize their families. Their annual income accounts for 30 percent of total household income, approximately PhP36,614. The majority of child labour are male, but girls are also involved. Girls are more vulnerable than boys to other forms of exploitation, such as child prostitution. Children are deprived of their childhood and education by child labour and exposed to occupational hazards related to working conditions in SSM. Children work in the mine under an incredible conditions. The soil, water and the air were polluted by heavy metal, such as mercury due to environmental hazards. In most of the mines, children have to work underground in darkness and airless. There is only one rope to get in and out of the mine. Sometimes they will use flashlights for lighting.

On Friday, June 10, the annual meeting of the International Labour Organization held in Geneva, Switzerland. At the same time, a global initiative was launched by the International Labour Organization (ILO) that to eliminate child labour in SSM with the government. With regard to mining, the Asian Labour Organization has taken positive measures to combat child labour in small-scale mining, while a number of technical cooperation projects have been carried out to illustrate how to crack down child labour in the mining industries. The best way to help child laborers is to improve the survivability, environmental sustainability and safety of the SSM economy.

Mining pollution 
Due to the irregular operation of mining, it has caused irreversible damage to the environment. Mining produces a lot of chemicals, causing serious pollution to air, soil and water resources.

Air pollution 
Underground mining is a common method of mining. In the process of mining, drilling and blasting are usually used to underground mining. Large amounts of dust and toxic gas are emitted after blasting, such as carbon monoxide, methane and sulfur dioxide. Most of these particles are harmful to the human body. If the particles inhaled into the lungs, it will cause lung perforation.

Coal is the primary energy needs demand of three of the four countries in Northeast Asia. Coal accounts for 77% of China, 85% of South Korea and 80% of Mongolia. In Northeast Asia, coal is used for both industrial and residential. Actually, almost half of the coal is used in heating system. Air pollution levels are exacerbated by extremely inefficient conversion of heating systems. In general, the main problem is that the sources of air pollution are generated during the coal combustion and conversion phases. The air pollution will result in a respiratory diseases. The greenhouse effect is caused directly by the carbon dioxide produced by burning coal.

Water pollution 
In China, coal mines pollute both air and water resources. Chemicals from coal mining begin to erode the soil, then gradually seep into the groundwater. According to the research, each ton of coal mine will pollute 1 cubic meter to 2.5 cubic meters of water resources. Mine water is essential for mine operation. In the process of mining, mine water will be contaminated with different intensity, especially acidic chemicals which formed acid mine drainage (AMD). A large number of sulfides-containing rocks are exploited during mining. These rocks react with oxygen and water in the air to produce sulfuric acid. As long as the rocks are exposed to the air, sulfuric acid seeps from them. These acidic substances will pass through rainwater into the river and soil.

Mining spill in Fujian China 
In Fujian Province, China, a leakage accident occurred in the mining waste pool of a Zijinshan Copper Mine, resulting in reservoir pollution. The nearby fishermen lost a lot of money and more than 4 million pounds of fish were killed by toxic. Xinghua news reported that Zijin Mining Company will take full responsibility for the incident. The company will compensate the fishermen for their losses. At the same time, the government issued a notice and mobilized local villagers to help salvage the toxic fish from the rivers.

Gold mine in Lao 
The mining industry is the main source of income for Lao. Gold mining in Vientiane has contaminated nearby rivers with large amounts of cyanide, which is one of the most common mining chemicals and used mainly to dissolve gold. Cyanide leaks usually occur during the rainy season. Overflow from sewage treatment plant caused cyanide enter rivers through the soil.

Soil pollution 
Soil is important to human. People use soil to develop agriculture and rely on soil-grown crops to survive. However, due to the large number of mining companies to develop the mining industry, resulting in serious soil pollution. Chemicals from mining minerals tend to create biochemical reactions when exposed to air. The resulting new material will slowly seep into the soil. As a result, over time, these chemicals accumulate more and more. The accumulated chemicals eventually form a variety of toxins hat harm human health. Farmers grow crops on the contaminated soil. During the growth of crops, nutrients are drawn from the soil. These toxins are absorbed through the roots of the plant. When the crops are ripe, they are sold to the market and end up being eaten by people. These toxins are absorbed by human body and threaten their health.

The staple food in China is rice, and the annual production of rice is also considerable. According to the industrial and commercial bureau investigation, some rice was found to contain excessive levels of heavy metals. These heavy metals are all carcinogens to human body.

China has always been beset by soil pollution. According to the study, more than 2/3 of the cultivated land is polluted, and 82.8% of the soil samples contain nickel, lead, arsenic, copper, mercury, chromium, zinc and cadmium.

Sustainability
Mineral sector and sustainable development need to be considered from four aspects: society, economy, environment and management, which as a new framework. Mineral industry is an important economic activity in contemporary society. Governance systems need to be constantly developed and improved if the government departments want to promote sustainable development for demonstrate the continuously improvement of their economic, social and environmental contributions.

Minerals are a diversified sector with more than 80 mineral products, although the mineral sector exists as a relatively small one in the global economy. Some metals were discovered and used thousands of years ago, while others have only recently been used. With the improvement of automatic mechanization, the employment rate of mining industry is declining rapidly. According to the Labor Bureau, 30 million people are engaged in large-scale mining and 13 million people are involved in small-scale mining activities (SSM), accounting for 1 per cent of the world's labour force. Partly estimated, the number of people who dependent on mining industry as their main source of income approximately 300 million.

As an important economic activity in the world, mineral production accounts for at least 25% of commodity exports in 34 countries. Moreover, mineral production activities are gradually concentrated in developing countries. In the past few centuries, the prices of some mineral commodities have fluctuated with the continuous improvement of mining technology and the different demand for mineral resources in the market. Minerals are widely used in all fields of society, and society is also highly dependent on the value of minerals. The use and production of minerals is essential for livelihood and economic development through employment and income generation. With the increasing population and per capita income, the demand for mineral products is also increasing. Therefore, developing countries choose to expand mineral consumption to meet the basic needs of the population. Ecologically, most mineral resources are non-renewable resources. Even if the continued use of minerals for centuries has not led to the scarcity of minerals, there is no guarantee that they will last into the future.

References